Les Planes is a railway station in Les Planes, in the Serra de Collserola hills, part of the Sarrià-Sant Gervasi district of Barcelona. It is served by lines S1 and S2 of the Metro del Vallès commuter rail system, which are operated by Ferrocarrils de la Generalitat de Catalunya, who also run the station.

The station has three tracks, although the track nearest the station building is a terminal track only accessible from the south. The tracks are served by four platform faces, but only those of the island platform between the through tracks are in normal use. This platform is accessed by footbridge, stairs, and lifts.

The station building is the only example of a railway station in Catalonia executed in the  modernista or art nouveau style. It opened in 1916 as the northern terminus of the first section of the line from Peu del Funicular station to the Vallès.

See also
 List of railway stations in Barcelona
 List of Modernisme buildings in Barcelona

References

External links

Les Planes at Trenscat.com
Les Planes at the city council website.

Stations on the Barcelona–Vallès Line
Railway stations in Spain opened in 1916
Transport in Sarrià-Sant Gervasi
Modernisme architecture in Barcelona
Art Nouveau railway stations